Events from the year 1823 in Ireland.

Events
Catholic Association formed by Daniel O'Connell, to further Catholic Emancipation.
October – HMS Essex, a former American frigate of 1799, is hulked at Cork to serve as a prison ship; from 1824 to 1834 she serves in this capacity at Kingstown.

Arts and literature
5 August – the Royal Hibernian Academy of Painting, Sculpture, and Architecture is established by letters patent in Dublin.

Births
1 January – Edward Butler, lawyer and politician in Australia (died 1879).
12 January – James Donnelly, Bishop of the Diocese of Clogher (died 1893).
23 January – Abraham Fitzgibbon, railway civil engineer in the British empire (died 1887 in England)
26 March – Ann Jellicoe, educationalist (died 1880).
7 July – John Kells Ingram, poet, scholar, economist and historian of economic thought (died 1907).
7 September – Kevin Izod O'Doherty, transported to Australia in 1849, physician and politician (died 1905).
10 September – James O'Connor, first Archbishop of the Roman Catholic Archdiocese of Omaha (died 1890).
16 September – James O'Reilly, lawyer and politician in Canada (died 1875).
Full date unknown
Thomas Devin Reilly, revolutionary, Young Irelander and journalist (died 1854).
John Ryan, soldier, recipient of the Victoria Cross for gallantry in 1857 at Lucknow, India, killed in action (died 1858).

Deaths
21 February – Charles Wolfe, poet (born 1791).
17 September – John Shaw, Captain in the United States Navy (born 1773).

References

 
Years of the 19th century in Ireland
1820s in Ireland
Ireland
 Ireland